The Fabulous Senorita is a 1952 American musical comedy film directed by R. G. Springsteen and starring Estelita Rodriguez, Robert Clarke and Nestor Paiva. The film came at the tail-end of a cycle of Latin American-themed films, through it did introduce a new star, Rita Moreno.

Plot

Cast
 Estelita Rodriguez as Estelita Rodriguez 
 Robert Clarke as Jerry Taylor 
 Nestor Paiva as José Rodriguez 
 Marvin Kaplan as Clifford Van Kunkle 
 Rita Moreno as Manuela Rodríguez 
 Leon Belasco as Señor Gonzales 
 Tito Renaldo as Pedro Sanchez 
 Tom Powers as Delaney 
 Emory Parnell as Dean Bradshaw 
 Olin Howland as Justice of the Peace 
 Vito Scotti as Esteban Gonzales 
 Martin Garralaga as Police Captain Garcia 
 Nita Del Rey as Felice  
 Joan Blake as Betty 
 Frances Dominguez as Amelia
 Betty Farrington as Janitress 
 Norman Field as Dr. Campbell 
 Clark Howat as Davis 
 Frank Kreig as Cab Driver 
 Dorothy Neumann as Mrs. Black
 Elizabeth Slifer as Wife of Justice of the Peace 
 Charles Sullivan as Cab Driver 
 Arthur Walsh as Pete

References

Bibliography
 Roberts, John Storm. The Latin Tinge: The Impact of Latin American Music on the United States. Oxford University Press, 1998.

External links

1952 films
American musical comedy films
American black-and-white films
1952 musical comedy films
Films directed by R. G. Springsteen
Republic Pictures films
Films with screenplays by Jack Townley
1950s English-language films
1950s American films